Abraham (Adolf) Berliner (2 May 1833 – 21 April 1915)  (Hebrew: אברהם ברלינר) was a German theologian and historian, born in Obersitzko, in the Grand Duchy of Posen, Prussia. He was initially educated by his father, who was the teacher in Obersitzko. He continued his education under various rabbis, later studying at the University of Leipzig where he received the degree of doctor of philosophy.

After serving for some time as preacher and teacher in Arnswalde, in 1865 Berliner was called to Berlin to  be superintendent of the religious school run by the Society for Talmudic Studies (Ḥebrat Shas).  In 1873, when Israel Hildesheimer opened the rabbinical seminary in Berlin, Berliner was selected as professor of Jewish history and literature. In this role and as an author, he was untiring. His edition of Rashi's commentary to the Pentateuch (1866) first made him known as a scholar. Berliner added to his reputation through his various historical works, the result of his research in the archives and libraries of Italy, which was financially supported by the German government.

In 1874-75 Berliner edited the scientific periodical Magazin für Jüdische Geschichte und Literatur.  From 1876 to 1893 he, together with his colleague, David Hoffmann, continued to edit the periodical under the revised title Magazin für die Wissenschaft des Judenthums. 

It was due to his zeal that the Hebrew literary society Meḳiẓe Nirdamim was revived in 1885.  This society was dedicated towards the publication of older Jewish literature with Berliner now as its director. He engaged as a defender of Judaism in a pamphlet against Paul de Lagarde (Prof. Paul de Lagarde, nach Seiner Natur Gezeichnet, 1887), who denounced all Jewish scholars as dilettanti; and when the blood accusation was revived, he republished (1888) the opinion of Cardinal Ganganelli (afterwards Pope Clement XIV) to prove the falsity of this charge.

While Orthodox in his religious views, Berliner was never a fanatic. Not only was his scientific work in line with liberal thinking, but he also paid a high tribute to the merits of Moritz Steinschneider, on the occasion of the latter's seventieth birthday (1886), by compiling a bibliography of that eminent scholar's works.

Works

The following is a list of Berliner's works:
 Raschi, Commentar zum Pentateuch, 1866
 Aus dem Inneren Leben der Deutschen Juden im Mittelalter, 1871; 2d ed., 1900
 Pleṭat Soferim: Beiträge zur Jüdischen Schriftauslegung im Mittelalter, 1872
 Yesod 'Olam, das Aelteste Bekannte Dramatische Gedicht in Hebr. Sprache, von Mose Sacut, 1874
 Die Massorah zum Targum Onkelos, 1875, 1877
 Migdal Ḥananel, Ueber Leben und Schriften R. Chananel's in Kairuan, 1876
 Ein Gang Durch die Bibliotheken Italiens, 1877
 Rabbi Jesaja Berlin: Eine Biographische Skizze, 1879
 Beiträge zur Hebräischen Grammatik im Talmud und Midrasch, 1879
 Hebräische Grabschriften in Italien, 1881
 Persönliche Beziehungen Zwischen Juden und Christen im Mittelalter, 1882
 Beiträge zur Geographie und Ethnographie Babyloniens im Talmud und Midrasch, 1884
 Targum Onkelos (now the standard edition), 1884
 Aus den Letzten Tagen des Römischen Ghetto, 1886
 Censur und Confiscation Hebräischer Bücher im Kirchenstaate, 1891
 Geschichte der Juden in Rom, von der Aeltesten Zeit bis zur Gegenwart (2050 Jahre), 3 vols., 1893
 Ueber den Einfluss des Ersten Hebräischen Buchdrucks auf den Cultus und die Cultur der Juden, 1896
 Aus Meiner Bibliothek, Ein Beitrag zur Bibliographie und Typographie, 1898.

Jewish Encyclopedia bibliography
Nahum Sokolow, Sefer Ziḳḳaron, p. 13
Warsaw, 1889
Reines, Dor we-Ḥakamaw.

References

1833 births
1915 deaths
People from Szamotuły County
German Jewish theologians
People from the Province of Posen
19th-century German theologians
19th-century German historians
German male non-fiction writers
19th-century male writers